9th CDG Awards
February, 2007

Contemporary: 
 The Queen 

Fantasy: 
 Pan's Labyrinth 

Period: 
 Curse of the Golden Flower 
The 9th Costume Designers Guild Awards, given in 2007, honoured the best costume designs in film and television for 2006.

Winners and nominees

Film
 Contemporary Film:
  Consolata Boyle – The Queen 
 Gabriela Diaque, Miwako Kobayashi, and Michael Wilkinson – Babel
 Lindy Hemming – Casino Royale
 Nancy Steiner – Little Miss Sunshine
 Patricia Field – The Devil Wears Prada

 Fantasy Film:
  Lala Huete – Pan's Labyrinth (El laberinto del fauno) 
 Kym Barrett – Eragon
 Renée April – The Fountain
 Judianna Makovsky – X-Men: The Last Stand
 Sammy Sheldon – V for Vendetta

 Period Film:
  Yee Chung-Man – Curse of the Golden Flower (Man cheng jin dai huang jin jia) 
 Sharen Davis – Dreamgirls
 Ngila Dickson – The Illusionist
 Milena Canonero – Marie Antoinette
 Penny Rose – Pirates of the Caribbean: Dead Man's Chest

Television
 Contemporary Series:
  Eduardo Castro – Ugly Betty 
 Chrisi Karvonides-Dushenko – Big Love
 Catherine Adair – Desperate Housewives
 Amy Westcott – Entourage
 Juliet Polcsa – The Sopranos

 Fantasy or Period Series:
  April Ferry – Rome 
 Patia Prouty and Maria Schicker – Cold Case
 Katherine Jane Bryant – Deadwood

 Miniseries or Television Film:
  Mike O'Neill – Elizabeth I 
 Andrea Galer – Bleak House
 Tom McKinley – High School Musical
 Michael T. Boyd – Into the West
 Julie Weiss – Mrs. Harris

Costume Designers Guild Awards
2006 film awards
2006 television awards
2006 guild awards
2006 in fashion
2007 in American cinema
2007 in American television